The striped harlequin snake (Homoroselaps dorsalis) is a species of snake in the family Atractaspididae.
It is found in South Africa and Eswatini.

References

Atractaspididae
Reptiles of South Africa
Reptiles described in 1849
Taxonomy articles created by Polbot